Georgina Mary Beatrice Downer (born 29 September 1979 in Brussels, Belgium) is an Australian political figure and Director of the Robert Menzies Institute. She has unsuccessfully contested several elections, and is a lawyer and former diplomat.

Early life and education
Downer was born in Brussels in 1979 to Nicky and Alexander Downer. Her father, later leader of the opposition, was based in Belgium as a diplomat. Nicky had been a journalist for the Australian Broadcasting Corporation (ABC). She is a member of the Downer political family, with several family members active in political life.

After graduating from Seymour College in 1997, Downer moved from Adelaide to study law at the University of Melbourne. In 2005, Downer won a Chevening Scholarship to study at the London School of Economics, where she graduated with a master's degree.

Working life
Downer joined the Department of Foreign Affairs and Trade as a graduate trainee in 2007, later spending four years in Japan. Working at the Australian Embassy, she reached the position of second secretary.

Politics
In 2015, Downer was linked in the media to the Senate seat vacated by Michael Ronaldson; and as a possible replacement for Kevin Andrews in the seat of Menzies. In 2016, she was mooted as a possible replacement for Bruce Billson in the seat of Dunkley. 

Downer contested the Liberal pre-selection for the seat of Goldstein in 2016, but was defeated by Tim Wilson.

She was the endorsed Liberal candidate for the seat of Mayo in the Australian House of Representatives in the 2018 by-election and in the 2019 general election, but both times was unsuccessful. Her promotion of the funding of a sports grant while a candidate, instead of the current member for the seat, Rebekha Sharkie, was a key initiating factor in the public coverage of the sports rorts affair of 2020. Downer returned to Melbourne shortly after her 2019 defeat.

Personal life
Downer married Will Heath, a lawyer with King & Wood Mallesons, in 2009. The couple had met at university in 2000. They have two children.

Electoral History

Federal

References

1979 births
Living people
Australian diplomats
Australian expatriates in Belgium